Milford Junction is an unincorporated community in Van Buren Township, Kosciusko County, in the U.S. state of Indiana.

History
Milford Junction is a railroad junction outside Milford, Indiana, hence the name.

Geography

References

Unincorporated communities in Kosciusko County, Indiana
Unincorporated communities in Indiana